Baby box may refer to:

Baby hatch or foundling wheel, a place a baby, usually newborn, is brought anonymously to be cared for by others, often leading to adoption
Maternity package, also called baby box, a kit of baby clothes and equipment given to pregnant women in some countries
The Baby Box, a play directed by Stephen Henry
Air crib, an easily cleaned, temperature and humidity-controlled crib designed by B. F. Skinner
One of the areas in the Ministry of Sound nightclub